Iphigenia in Aulis or Iphigenia at Aulis (variously translated, including the Latin Iphigenia in Aulide) is the last of the extant works by the playwright Euripides. Written between 408, after Orestes, and 406 BC, the year of Euripides' death, the play was first produced the following year in a trilogy with The Bacchae and Alcmaeon in Corinth by his son or nephew, Euripides the Younger, and won first place at the City Dionysia in Athens.

Set prior to the commencement of the Trojan War, "Iphigenia at Aulis" revolves around the strong resistance by Clytemnestra to the decision of her husband, Agamemnon, the leader of the Greek coalition before and during the Trojan War, to ritually sacrifice and kill his daughter, Iphigenia, to appease the goddess Artemis. This will allow his troops to set sail to preserve their honour in order to battle and ultimately sack Troy, something which will result in the killing by Agamemnon and the Greek men of all of Troy's men and the enslavement of all of its women. These latter events are central to several of the Greek tragedies such as Euripides' "Hecuba" and "The Trojan Women", as well as Aeschylus' play "Agamemnon".

The conflict in "Iphigenia at Aulis" also focuses closely on Iphigenia's initial resistance to the idea of dying/being killed and her relationship with her father and, to a lesser degree, on a young Achilles, who is drawn into the situation by Agamemnon. Also known to the audience of Athenians who witnessed the play's performance would have been the fact that, as a result of Agamemnon's actions, after the war he will be killed upon his homecoming by his wife, Clytemnestra, and that she in turn will be killed by her son, Orestes, in order to avenge his father. All appear in "Iphigenia at Aulis".

Background
The Greek fleet is waiting at Aulis, Boeotia, with its ships ready to sail for Troy, but is unable to depart due to a strange lack of wind. After consulting the seer Calchas, the Greek leaders learn that this is no mere meteorological abnormality but rather the will of the goddess Artemis, who is withholding the winds because Agamemnon has offended her.

Calchas informs the general that in order to appease the goddess, he must sacrifice his eldest daughter, Iphigenia. Agamemnon, in spite of his horror, must consider this seriously because his assembled troops, who have been waiting on the beach and are increasingly restless, may rebel if their bloodlust is not satisfied. He sends a message to his wife, Clytemnestra, telling her to send Iphigenia to Aulis on the pretext that the girl is to be married to the Greek warrior Achilles before he sets off to fight.

Plot

At the start of the play, Agamemnon has second thoughts about going through with the sacrifice and sends a second message to his wife, telling her to ignore the first. Clytemnestra never receives it, however, because it is intercepted by Menelaus, Agamemnon's brother, who is enraged over his change of heart.

To Menelaus, this is not only a personal blow (for it is his wife, Helen, with whom the Trojan prince Paris ran off, and whose retrieval is the main pretext for the war), it may also lead to mutiny and the downfall of the Greek leaders should the rank and file discover the prophecy and realise that their general has put his family above their pride as soldiers.

The brothers debate the matter and, eventually, each seemingly changes the other's mind.  Menelaus is apparently convinced that it would be better to disband the Greek army than to have his niece killed, but Agamemnon is now ready to carry out the sacrifice, claiming that the army will storm his palace at Argos and kill his entire family if he does not. By this time, Clytemnestra is already on her way to Aulis with Iphigenia and her baby brother Orestes, making the decision of how to proceed all the more difficult.

Iphigenia is thrilled at the prospect of marrying one of the great heroes of the Greek army, but she, her mother, and the ostensible groom-to-be soon discover the truth. Furious at having been used as a prop in Agamemnon's plan, Achilles vows to defend Iphigenia, initially more for the purposes of his own honour than to save the innocent girl. However, when he tries to rally the Greeks against the sacrifice, he finds out that "the entirety of Greece"—including the Myrmidons under his personal command—demand that Agamemnon's wishes be carried out, and he barely escapes being stoned.

Clytemnestra and Iphigenia try in vain to persuade Agamemnon to change his mind, but the general believes that he has no choice. As Achilles prepares to defend Iphigenia by force, Iphigenia, realizing that she has no hope of escape, begs Achilles not to throw his life away in a lost cause. Over her mother's protests and to Achilles's admiration, she consents to her sacrifice, declaring that she would rather die heroically, winning renown as the savior of Greece, than be dragged unwilling to the altar. Leading the chorus in a hymn to Artemis, she goes to her death, with her mother Clytemnestra so distraught as to presage her murder of her husband and Orestes's matricide years later.

The play as it exists in the manuscripts ends with a messenger reporting that Iphigenia has been replaced on the altar by a deer. It is, however, generally considered that this is not an authentic part of Euripides' original text. "Paley agrees with Porson in regarding the rest of the play after Iphigenia's exit [lines 1510 to the end of the play] as the work of an interpolator". A fragment of the play may indicate that Artemis appeared to console Clytemnestra and assure her that her daughter had not been sacrificed after all, but if this is a surviving reference to Euripides' original ending, that ending is not extant.

Associated myths 
The first lines of the Chorus (Women of Chalcis) are:

"To the sandy beach of sea-coast Aulis I came after a voyage through the tides of Euripus, leaving Chalcis on its narrow firth, my city which feedeth the waters of far famed Arethusa near the sea,..."

About the Arethusa myth:

"The Sicilian well Arethusa, ...was believed to have a subterraneous communication with the river Alpheius, in Peloponnesus. According to Pausanias, Alpheius was a passionate hunter and fell in love with the nymph Arethusa, but she fled from him to the island of Ortygia near Syracuse, and metamorphosed herself into a well, whereupon Alpheius became a river, which flowing from Peloponnesus under the sea to Ortygia, there united its waters with those of the well Arethusa. This story is related somewhat differently by Ovid. Arethusa, a fair nymph, once while bathing in the river Alpheius in Arcadia, was surprised and pursued by the god; but Artemis took pity upon her and changed her into a well, which flowed under the earth to the island of Ortygia."

Cultural influence
The play inspired the tragedy Iphigénie (1674) by Jean Racine and was the basis of several operas in the eighteenth century, using librettos that drew from both Euripedes's and Racine's versions and had various plot variants. The earliest extant libretto is by Christian Heinrich Postel, Die wunderbar errettete Iphigenia, set by Reinhard Keiser in 1699. The most popular libretto was Apostolo Zeno's Ifigenia in Aulide (1718), set by Antonio Caldara (1718), Giuseppe Maria Orlandini (1732), Giovanni Porta (1738), Nicola Porpora (1735), Girolamo Abos (1752), Giuseppe Sarti (1777), Angelo Tarchi (1785), and Giuseppe Giordani (1786). Other libretti include Ifigenia by Matteo Verazi (set by Niccolò Jommelli, 1751), that of Vittorio Amadeo Cigna-Santi (set by Ferdinando Bertoni, 1762 and Carlo Franchi, 1766), that of Luigi Serio (set by Vicente Martín y Soler, 1779 and Alessio Prati, 1784), and that of Ferdinando Moretti (set by Niccolò Antonio Zingarelli, 1787 and Luigi Cherubini, 1788). However, the best-known opera today is Christoph Willibald Gluck's Iphigénie en Aulide (1774).

Iphigenia in Aulis has had a significant influence on modern art. Greek director Michael Cacoyannis based his 1977 film Iphigenia (starring Irene Papas as Clytemnestra) on Euripides's script. The play also formed the basis for the 2003 novel The Songs of the Kings by Barry Unsworth, as well as the P. D. Q. Bach cantata Iphigenia in Brooklyn. Neil LaBute drew heavily on the story of Iphigenia for his short play Iphigenia in Orem, one of his Bash series.

US Latina playwright Caridad Svich's 2004 multimedia play Iphigenia Crash Land Falls on the Neon Shell That Was Once Her Heart (a rave fable) is published in the international theatre journal TheatreForum, and also in the anthology Divine Fire: Eight Contemporary Plays Inspired by the Greeks published in 2005 by BackStage Books. The play re-sets Iphigenia's story in and around Ciudad Juárez and the murders of the Women of Juárez.

Charles L. Mee, an American playwright, adapted the text for the modern theatre through his project, "The Re-Making Project". Mee's "Iphigenia 2.0," which was inspired by Euripides's Iphigenia in Aulis, incorporates some texts from Alan Stuart-Smyth, Jim Graves, Jim Morris, Gaby Bashan, Richard Holmes, Richard Heckler, Dave Grossman, Wilfred Owen, and Anthony Swofford. The New York World Premiere of this version of "Iphigenia 2.0" was originally produced by Signature Theatre Company, New York City, and was described in the New York Times review as a "proudly unfaithful and rather tedious version of Euripides' "Iphigenia at Aulis." "

Greek director Yorgos Lanthimos based his 2017 film The Killing of a Sacred Deer loosely on the story of Agamemnon.  Image Comics plans a graphic novel version of the script to be released in May 2022, written by Edward Einhorn and with art by Eric Shanower.

Translations
 Jane Lumley (1537–1578), ca. 1555 (first published in 1909)
 Robert Potter, 1781 – verse
 T. A. Buckley, 1850 – prose
 , 1891 – prose
 Arthur Way, 1912 – verse
 Florence M. Stawell, 1929 – verse
 Charles R. Walker, 1958
 W. S. Merwin and George E. Dimock Jr., 1978 – verse
 Paul Roche, 1998 – verse (Euripides: Ten Plays (Signet))
 Mary-Kay Gamel, 1999 – prose
 James Morwood, 2002 – verse
 Don Taylor, 2004
 George Theodoridis, 2007
 Edward Einhorn, 2013
 Anne Lill, 2013 - Estonian, received Alexander Kurtna Award
 Nicolas Billon & Roger Beck, 2010
 Christopher Collard & James Morwood, 2017 – verse
 Andy Hinds, with Martine Cuypers 2017
 Brian Vinero, 2018 – verse
 Rachel Hadas, 2018 - verse

References

External links

Text at The Internet Classics Archive
Text at The Perseus Digital Library, Tufts University

Iphigenia
Plays by Euripides
Trojan War literature
Boeotian mythology
Plays set in ancient Greece
Greek plays adapted into films
Plays adapted into operas
Agamemnon
Plays based on classical mythology